The canton of Forcalquier is an administrative division in southeastern France. At the French canton reorganisation which came into effect in March 2015, the canton was expanded from 10 to 15 communes:
 
La Brillanne 
Cruis
Fontienne
Forcalquier
Lardiers
Limans
Lurs
Mallefougasse-Augès
Montlaux
Niozelles
Ongles
Pierrerue
Revest-Saint-Martin
Saint-Étienne-les-Orgues
Sigonce

Demographics

See also
Cantons of the Alpes-de-Haute-Provence department

References

Cantons of Alpes-de-Haute-Provence